The Shōwakai (literally Shōwa Society) was a political party in Japan.

History
The party was established in December 1935 by a group of 18 MPs who had left Rikken Seiyūkai and Mushozoku Club in protest at the former's decision to continue to oppose Keisuke Okada's government. Three Rikken Seiyūkai MPs, Uchida Nobuya, Tatsunosuke Yamazaki and Tokonami Takejirō had been expelled from the party after accepting cabinet positions, and the expulsions continued when several other MPs joined the government's Cabinet Deliberation Council.

In the 1936 elections the new party won 20 seats. Although several MPs joined it during the parliamentary term, it was reduced to 19 seats in the 1937 elections. Following the elections it was dissolved and the majority of its members rejoined Rikken Seiyūkai.

Election results

References

Defunct political parties in Japan
Political parties established in 1935
1935 establishments in Japan
Political parties disestablished in 1937
1937 disestablishments in Japan